Trailways Express (also released as Gone, Gone, Gone and Mo Joe) is an album by drummer Philly Joe Jones which was recorded in London in 1968 and released on the Black Lion label in 1971.

Reception

The AllMusic review by Scott Yanow stated "the music is generally straightahead hard bop. Drummer Philly Joe Jones, who has short solos on each of the six selections, is a dominant force even when playing brushes in the ensembles".

Track listing
 "Mo' Joe"  (Joe Henderson) – 4:29
 "Gone. Gone, Gone" (George Gershwin, Ira Gershwin) – 8:23
 "Baubles, Bangles, & Beads" (Robert Wright, George Forrest, Alexander Borodin) – 6:27
 "Trailways Express" (Jones) – 4:02
 "Here's That Rainy Day (Jimmy Van Heusen, Johnny Burke) – 9:07
 "Ladybird" (Tadd Dameron) – 5:20

Personnel
Philly Joe Jones – drums 
Les Condon – trumpet (track 4)
Kenny Wheeler – trumpet, flugelhorn (tracks 1, 2, 5 & 6) 
Chris Pyne – trombone
Peter King – alto saxophone
Harold McNair – tenor saxophone, flute 
Mike Pyne – piano
John Hart (track 4), Ron Mathewson (tracks 1-3, 5 & 6) – bass

References

Philly Joe Jones albums
1971 albums
Black Lion Records albums